Vranov nad Dyjí (until 1986 Vranov) is a market town in Znojmo District in the South Moravian Region of the Czech Republic. It has about 800 inhabitants. It is known as a summer resort.

Geography
Vranov nad Dyjí is located on the border with Austria. It borders the municipal territory of Hardegg.

Vranov nad Dyjí lies in the valley of the river Thaya. Part of the Vranov Reservoir, which is named after the market town, is situated in the northern part of the municipal territory. The Podyjí National Park occupies the southern part of the territory.

History

The first written mention of Vranov is from 1100, when the Vranov nad Dyjí Castle was mentioned in Chronica Boemorum. In 1323, the manor was acquired by the Lords of Lipá. The Lichtenburg noble family took control of Vranov during the 15th century. From 1516 to 1629, the manor often changed owners.

During the Thirty Years' War, the castle was besieged and damaged by Swedish troops, and the destruction was completed by a large fire in 1665. The Althann family, who acquired the castle in 1680, reconstructed the old Gothic structure into a representative Baroque residence. In the 19th century, the extensive landscape park was added.

Between 1790 and 1882, Vranov was known for its manufactory of earthenware. After 1816, the manufactory began producing ceramic of the wedgwood type.

Sights
Vranov nad Dyjí is known for the Vranov nad Dyjí Castle. Today the castle is owned by the state and is open to the public.

References

External links

Market towns in the Czech Republic
Populated places in Znojmo District